The second season of Wilfred, premiered on FX on June 21, 2012. The season consisted of 13 episodes. The series is based on the original Australian series, Wilfred, and stars Elijah Wood, Jason Gann, Fiona Gubelmann and Dorian Brown.

Synopsis 
The second season begins 4 months after Season 1 ended, where Ryan is dreaming that he is in a mental hospital, and Wilfred is in a wheelchair. After an outburst, the doctor attempts to give Ryan electroshock therapy, having received permission from Ryan's dad. Wilfred saves Ryan, and Ryan wakes up in a meeting at his new job. He rushes out of the meeting and runs to the basement door to read Wilfred's will. He removes everything from the closet and destroys the wall to reveal the basement. Wilfred's will turns out to be blank, except for the words "Keep Digging". Meanwhile, Wilfred and Drew come back from Wisconsin, unusually close, and reveal that Jenna and Drew are getting married. Wilfred tells Ryan that he is selfish, and won't listen to him, until Drew attempts to give Wilfred steroids to win a dog challenge. After Wilfred loses, Drew makes fun of him, and Ryan and Wilfred become friends again. Ryan's now-pregnant sister returns from India, and Ryan discovers a restraining order against her from Arturo Ramos, the father of her unborn child.  

Ryan attempts to have a dinner party with Jenna, Drew, and his co-worker, Amanda, whom he begins dating. Amanda appears odd around Wilfred, and after Wilfred and Bear ruin the dinner party, Amanda reveals that she discovered her Grandfather's two dogs consuming his deceased body, causing her fear of dogs. Amanda and Wilfred become close after he consoles her. After several weeks of dating, Ryan tells Amanda that he loves her, and they decide to move in together. After spending a night in the basement, playing a pointless game all night with Wilfred and Bruce, Ryan breaks up with Amanda. Afterwards, the company that Ryan works for loses all its investors, and his boss commits suicide. Ryan and his mother go on a road-trip, against her doctor's orders, after her cat, Mittens, passes away. After Ryan's sister shows up to retrieve Ryan and their mentally ill mother, she goes into labor, giving birth to a boy who she names Joffrey.

Jenna's career becomes a joke after her freak-out on live TV goes viral, and Wilfred finally convinces Ryan to come clean to her. Meanwhile, when Wilfred becomes jealous of the attention Jenna gives to the other neighborhood dogs, he accidentally pushes Drew's hunting shotgun over, which shoots Drew in the leg, days before his and Jenna's wedding, and Ryan offers to host the ceremony in his backyard for them. Ryan realizes that he is sad and misses Amanda, so he gets back together with her. At Drew and Jenna's, Ryan discovers that Amanda sold the formula that the company they were working for was creating, in hopes to run off with Ryan, and that she thinks that she can communicate with Wilfred, but cannot tell Ryan what Wilfred says to him. Amanda is taken to a mental hospital, and Wilfred finds a picture that Ryan drew as child that appears to have Wilfred in the background. Wilfred claims he drew the picture, and Ryan believes him until he sees a photo of himself as a child with the drawing, which has Wilfred in the background.

Cast

Main cast
 Elijah Wood as Ryan Newman
 Jason Gann as Wilfred
 Fiona Gubelmann as Jenna Mueller
 Dorian Brown as Kristen Newman

Special guest cast
 Mary Steenburgen as Catherine
 Dwight Yoakam as Bruce
 Allison Mack as Amanda
 Robin Williams as himself (uncredited) / Dr. Eddy
 John Michael Higgins as Dr. Cahill
 Brad Dourif as P.T.

Recurring cast
 Chris Klein as Drew
 Rodney To as Dr. Bangachon
 Rob Riggle as Kevin
 Steven Weber as Jeremy

Guest stars
 Eugene Byrd as James
 Nestor Carbonell as Arturo
 Gil Birmingham as Red Wolf

Episodes

Production
On August 6, 2011, Wilfred was renewed for a second season of 13 episodes. Season two commenced on June 21, 2012 with the season premiere labeled a special preview. On June 28, 2012, the season officially premiered following Anger Management. Prior to the official premiere date, FX released the season premiere on internet services such as Hulu, Yahoo!, FXnetworks.com and Wilfred Facebook page, for only a two-week period.

Notes

References

External links 

2012 American television seasons
Season 2